The 1924 NCAA Swimming and Diving Championships were contested as part of the first annual NCAA swim meet to determine the team and individual national champions of men's collegiate swimming and diving in the United States. 

The championship was hosted by the United States Naval Academy at Scott Natatorium in Annapolis, Maryland.

Only individual championships were officially contested during the first thirteen-NCAA sponsored swimming and diving championships. Unofficial team standings were kept but a team title was not officially awarded until 1937. 

Northwestern is acknowledged as this year's unofficial team champion, the first title for the Wildcats.

See also
List of college swimming and diving teams

References

NCAA Division I Men's Swimming and Diving Championships
NCAA Swimming And Diving Championships
NCAA Swimming And Diving Championships